Arbër Shala (born 23 December 1991) is a Kosovan professional footballer who plays as a left back for Macedonian club KF Renova.

Club career

Laçi
On 4 August 2016, Shala joined Albanian club Laçi, taking squad number 3 for the 2016–17 season. He made his competitive debut on 7 September in the opening matchday against Korabi Peshkopi which ended in a goalless draw. He quickly established himself in the starting lineup, playing at the back. On 1 April of the following year, during the 2–0 away loss to Teuta Durrës in the matchday 27, Shala was sent-off after a bad tackle on Faisal Bangal. Five days later, he was later suspended for 6 matches for his behaviour towards the match official by the Disciplinary Committee of AFA. He finished his first full season in Albania by making 34 appearances, including 29 in league, collecting 2080 minutes as Laçi secured a spot in the top flight for another season.

The 2017–18 season was less successful for Shala, as he lost the place in the starting lineup, managing to play only 12 league matches, only 7 as starter, collecting 636 minutes as Laçi finished 4th to return to Europa League qualifying rounds once again. He scored his first goal for Laçi on 13 September in the first leg of cup first round versus Sopoti Librazhd; the match finished in a shock result, with Laçi winning 12–0. On 31 May 2018, Shala's contract run out and the parties decided not to continue their cooperation, ending his spell with 41 league matches.

Drita
On 7 June 2018, Shala joined fellow Football Superleague of Kosovo side and reigning champions Drita, signing a two-year contract. On 8 January 2019, Shala was loaned out to Albanian club FC Kamza.

Liria Prizren
On 27 July 2019 Liria Prizren announced, that they had signed Shala. He moved on to Dukagjini in January 2020.

Renova
In mid-August 2020, 28-year old Shala moved to FK Renova in North Macedonia.

Career statistics

References

External links
FSHF profile

1991 births
Living people
People from Orahovac
Association football fullbacks
Kosovan footballers
SC Gjilani players
KF Hajvalia players
KF Laçi players
FC Drita players
FC Kamza players
KF Liria players
FK Renova players
Kategoria Superiore players
Football Superleague of Kosovo players
Macedonian First Football League players
Kosovan expatriate footballers
Kosovan expatriate sportspeople in North Macedonia
Kosovan expatriate sportspeople in Albania
Expatriate footballers in Albania
Expatriate footballers in North Macedonia